"What I've Done" is a song by American rock band Linkin Park. It was released as the first single from their third studio album, Minutes to Midnight (2007), and is the sixth track. The song was released as a radio single on April 1, 2007, as a digital download on April 2, and as a CD single on April 30. The live version of "What I've Done" from Road to Revolution: Live at Milton Keynes was nominated for Best Hard Rock Performance at the 52nd Grammy Awards, but did not win. It serves as the end credits track of the 2007 science fiction film Transformers and also appears on Transformers: The Album (2007). Being certified six times platinum by the RIAA, it is the band's most commercially successful single in terms of pure sales, and reached number 7 on the Billboard Hot 100.

"What I've Done" was featured in the video game Guitar Hero World Tour. In January 2011, it was released in a Linkin Park DLC pack for Rock Band 3. The song is also a B-side to the UK single of "Iridescent". An instrumental version of the song is currently used by Sky UK as background music for their interactive services.

Composition
Chester Bennington described the track in a March 2007 interview with MTV:

The single and video appeared in the iTunes Store shortly after midnight EST on April 2, 2007. It became available the day after on iTunes in the UK and Australia. On April 2, the song was featured streaming on the front page of their official website, with the video being added to the site shortly thereafter.

The song is composed in the key of G minor. It starts out with a short 3-second guitar part and then a piano motif, before adding a hip hop-inspired drum line, and then introducing a raw-sounding guitar riff. When the song is played live at Linkin Park's concerts, Mike Shinoda plays the piano intro and the guitar after that. This song differs from most of Linkin Park's songs from previous albums in that it features almost no lead vocals from vocalist Shinoda, with the exception of a brief "na na na" refrain at the end. "What I've Done" was the last song written for Minutes to Midnight. The song also has a downbeat exactly once every second, consistent throughout its entirety.

Shinoda created a remix of the song, which is called "What I've Done (Distorted Remix)", which is included as a b-side to "Bleed It Out". The remix was then included in the international tour edition of Minutes to Midnight, as well as a track in the Linkin Park Underground-exclusive CD Underground X: Demos.

Music videos

Main music video
The music video for "What I've Done" was filmed in the California desert and was directed by Linkin Park turntablist Joe Hahn. The video begins with grass sinking down into the dirt, causing it to turn wet. It features footage of the band performing in an area outside of the city, interspersed with footage showing many political movements and humanitarian issues including pollution, racism, Nazism, the Ku Klux Klan, abortion, terrorism, Holocaust, deforestation, poverty, drug addiction, obesity, destruction, rising gasoline prices and crimes committed by humanity. The video ends with the same clip from the beginning but played in reverse, where it has the grass re-growing. Some cutscenes, such as the traffic scene and the napalm exploding, were also featured in the Rise Against music video for "Ready to Fall". The video premiered on April 2, 2007, on MTV and Fuse. It premiered on MTV Asia, MTV Germany, TMF Netherlands and Canada's MuchMusic on April 3, 2007.

As of February 2023, the music video for "What I've Done" has over 590 million views on YouTube.

The video clip was featured and won on MTV's Battle of the Videos against videos by Evanescence ("Sweet Sacrifice") and Lil' Mama ("Lip Gloss"). The video also marks the first appearance of a Linkin Park video in the #1 spot on MTV's TRL, hitting #1 six times so far. AOL currently has a live performance of "What I've Done" on their website. MTV's James Montgomery called "What I've Done" the "biggest, baddest and best Linkin Park video of all time," praising the visuals as well as the numerous political figures and events occurring within the video. He summarized the video's message: "Hahn was smart — or brave — enough to inject a message here: the destructive power of man versus the unyielding beauty of nature, and where it all will undoubtedly end."

As mentioned in episode 89 of MTV Cribs, Chester's jacket was lent to him by Yellowcard frontman Ryan Key.

Alternate music video
A second video, made exclusively for Australia, features a considerably different scenario from the first; instead of clips of human sin, the video tells the story of a woman (played by Emma Mullings) working at a government-run pharmaceutical company learning of a plan to develop a deadly new virus for "social control", and – with the help of several people dressed in black hooded sweatshirts with Linkin Park's logo on them – smuggles out several blood samples of a human test subject of the virus to expose the conspiracy. The video can be seen on YouTube and Linkin Park's Australian website.

Commercial performance
Despite Minutes to Midnight having mixed responses, the song made big debuts on the US charts during the chart week of April 21, 2007. The song debuted in the top 10 of the US Hot 100 on April 10, 2007, at #7. It is the band's second highest debut to date on the chart (this title was previously held by "Somewhere I Belong" which opened at #47), earning "Hot Shot" debut of the week, and subsequently becoming the third highest position for a Linkin Park single to date on the Hot 100. The song was their highest debut until they released "New Divide" in May 2009. At the time of its debut it was only the eleventh song since 2000 to debut at #7 or higher on the Hot 100, and only the third song to do so by an artist not from American Idol. The song was partly fueled by digital sales, debuting at #4 on the digital chart. The song was certified 6× Platinum by the RIAA on May 12, 2022. It reached 3 million downloads by early 2011, making it their most successful digital song in the US.  As of January 2015, the song has sold 3,700,000 copies in the US.

In addition the song became only the third song ever to open at #1 on the Modern Rock chart, also becoming the band's seventh number one on the chart. It held the #1 spot on Alternative Songs for 15 consecutive weeks, at the time tying it with Marcy Playground's "Sex and Candy" The song also reached #1 on the Mainstream Rock chart, where it stayed for 8 consecutive weeks. In the iTunes music store, the song had reached number two. It was kept out of the top spot by "Give It to Me" by Timbaland. The music video is the first to reach the number 1 spot on TRL for Linkin Park video history. It has also become a moderate hit on the Adult Top 40, and Pop 100 Airplay charts, peaking at number 21 and 17 respectively on those charts.

The song hit #6 in the UK once the physical format was released, making it Linkin Park's highest-charting UK single.

In other media
In August 2022, an internet meme was born using "What I've Done" as a template for various films "but it came out in 2007." It was inspired by the usage of the song in the first Transformers film to showcase how well the song fits with other closing scenes in other media.

Track listings

Personnel

 Chester Bennington – lead vocals
 Mike Shinoda – rhythm guitar, keyboards, vocals
 Brad Delson – lead guitar
 Dave "Phoenix" Farrell – bass guitar
 Joe Hahn – turntables, samples
 Rob Bourdon – drums

Charts

Weekly charts

Year-end charts

Certifications

Release history

See also
List of Billboard number-one alternative singles of the 2000s

References

External links

 What I've Done official lyrics

2007 songs
2007 singles
Linkin Park songs
Hard rock ballads
Number-one singles in Finland
Songs from Transformers (film series)
Song recordings produced by Rick Rubin
Songs written by Mike Shinoda
Warner Records singles
American hard rock songs